The men's +109 kg competition at the 2018 World Weightlifting Championships was held on 10 November 2018.

The International Weightlifting Federation had reorganized the weight categories and discarded all prior world records;
only performances meeting defined "world standards" were to count as new records.

Schedule

Medalists

Records

Results

New records

References

External links
Results 
Results Group A
Results Group B
Results Group C

Men's 110 kg